Robert Storr (born 1949) is an American curator, critic, painter, and writer.

Education
Robert Storr received his B.A. in History and French from Swarthmore College in 1972, and earned an M.F.A. in Art from the School of the Art Institute of Chicago in 1978.

Career
From 1990 to 2002 Storr was curator, then senior curator, in the Department of Painting and Sculpture at the Museum of Modern Art. As a curator, Storr made his mark early with a number of major exhibitions at the museum and elsewhere, which enhanced the public prominence of such artists as Elizabeth Murray, Gerhard Richter, Max Beckmann, Tony Smith and Robert Ryman. He also organized a number of reinstallations of MoMA's permanent collection, covering such topics as abstraction and the modern grotesque. From 2002 to 2006 he was the first Rosalie Solow Professor of Modern Art at the Institute of Fine Arts, New York University. Per New York magazine, he is considered to be one of the most influential Americans in the art world. 
 
Storr has been described as "an artist who's logged enough studio time to have a special regard for painters' painters ... and a gifted writer who can make us appreciate them, too." and a "vital link between the museum world and academia."

Over the years, he has written for the following publications: Art in America, Artforum, Art Press, Corriere della sera, Frieze, New York Times, Washington Post, Village Voice, The Brooklyn Rail, Art & Design, and Interview. Until April 2011 his regular column 'View from the Bridge' appeared in Frieze magazine.

He was the first American Director of Visual Arts of the Venice Biennale in 2007. He has taught at the CUNY graduate center and the Bard Center for Curatorial Studies as well as the Rhode Island School of Design, Tyler School of Art, New York Studio School and Harvard University, and has been a frequent lecturer in this country and abroad. Storr was reappointed Dean of the Yale School of Art for a second five-year period beginning July 2011. After completing his second term as Dean, Storr continues to teach at the Yale School of Art as a tenured Professor in the Department of Painting/Printmaking.

Awards and honors
He has been awarded a Penny McCall Foundation Grant for painting, a Norton Family Foundation Curator Grant, a Guggenheim Fellowship in 2016, and honorary doctorates from the School of the Art Institute of Chicago, the Maine College of Art, Swarthmore College, the University of the Arts London, the Nova Scotia College of Art and Design, and Montserrat College of Art.

He also received awards from the American Chapter of the International Association of Art Critics, a special AICA award for Distinguished Contribution to the Field of Art Criticism, an ICI Agnes Gund Curatorial Award, and the Lawrence A. Fleischman Award for Scholarly Excellence in the Field of American Art History from the Smithsonian Institution's Archives of American Art. In June 2017 his book, "Intimate Geometries: The Art and Life of Louise Bourgeois" was awarded the FILAF D'OR at the Festival International du Livre d'Art et du Film, Pergignan, France. In 2000 the French Ministry of Culture presented him with the medal of Chevalier des Arts et des Lettres and in 2010 promoted him to Officier of the same order.

Personal Studio Practice
In addition to his curatorial and academic accomplishments Storr is also himself a practicing visual artist. In a 2012 Seattle Times interview regarding an exhibition of his paintings at Seattle’s Francine Seders Gallery he was quoted as saying, "I started out as a painter more than 35 years ago, and I’ve never stopped. I’ve never become an ex-painter. [...] I certainly know how difficult it is to make art. [...] Making art has made me a better curator. Whether or not being a curator has made me a better artist remains to be seen.” The four paintings made by Storr featured in this exhibition were titled S.P. #1, 2, 3, and 4, and were geometric abstractions featuring horizontal divisions between black and white space with pairs of smaller red dots occupying the white space. The show paired Storr's work with paintings by Denzil Hurley.

Associations
Complementing his career as a curator, writer, painter and teacher, he serves on the Art Advisory Council of the International Foundation for Art Research   (IFAR).

Selected works
A comprehensive bibliography of Storr's published writing from 1980 through April 2020 has been compiled by Francesca Pietropaolo in Robert Storr Writings on Art 1980-2005, Heni Publishing, 2020.   Storr's published writings encompass 928 works in 1983 publications in 12 languages and 32,500 library holdings.  

 Robert Storr Writings on Art 2006-2021, edited and with an introduction by Francesca Pietropaolo, Heni Publishing, November 2021
 Crumb's World, with an essay by Robert Storr, David Zwirner Books, 2021
 Robert Storr Writings on Art 1980-2005, edited and with an introduction  by Francesca Pietropaolo, Heni Publishing, November 2020
 Philip Guston: A Life Spent Painting, Laurence King Publishing, 2020 
 Robert Storr Interviste sull'arte, edited and with a preface by Francesca Pietropaolo, 2019 (in Italian)
 Nancy Graves: Mapping, Mitchell-Innes & Nash, 2019
 Unfettering Reveries: The Incompiuto Siciliano. In Robert Storr, Marc Auge, Alterazioni Video et al. Incompiuto. The Birth of a Style. Milan: Humboldt Books, 2018
 Robert Storr Interviews on Art, edited and with a preface by Francesca Pietropaolo,  Heni, 2017
 Intimate Geometries: the Art and Life of Louise Bourgeois, The Monacelli Press, 2016
 How to Look: Ad Reinhardt Art Comics, David Zwirner Books, 2013
 Selections from the private collection of Robert Rauschenberg, Gagosian Gallery, 2012
 In direzione ostinata e contraria: scritti sull'arte contemporanea,, edited, introduced and translated by Francesca Pietropaolo 2011
 The Painter's Painter essay in Arshille Gorky: A Retrospective, 2010
 Alice Neel Painted Truths, Yale University Press, 2010
 September: A History Painting by Gerhardt Richter, Tate Publishing, 2009
 Gerhardt Richter: the Cage Paintings, Heni, 2009
 Think with the senses, feel with the mind: art in the present tense, Catalog for the 52nd Biennale di Venezia, Rizzoli, 2007
 Concentration Now Begins... essay in Thomas Nozkowski; Subject to Change, Ludwig Museum, 2007
 As Far as the Eye Can See essay in Rackstraw Downes, Princeton University Press, 2005
 Elizabeth Murray, Museum of Modern Art, 2005
 Popped Art, Museum of Modern Art, 2005
 Touching Down Lightly, 2005
 Disparities & Deformations: Our Grotesque, Exhibition Catalog, The Fifth Annual Santa Fe Biennial, 2004
 Louise Bourgeois, Phaidon, 2003
 Gerhard Richter: Doubt and Belief in Painting, Museum of Modern Art, 2003
 Nancy Spero : The War Series, 1966-1970, Charta, 2003
 Gerhard Richter: Forty Years of Painting, Museum of Modern Art, 2002
 Philip Pearlstein Since 1983, Harry N. Abrams, 2002
 Modern Art Despite Modernism, Museum of Modern Art, 2000
 Gerhard Richter : October 18, 1977, Museum of Modern Art, 2000
 Prince of Tides : Robert Storr talks with Harald Szeemann, 1999
 On the Edge : Contemporary Art from the Werner and Elaine Dannheisser collection, 1998
 Chuck Close, Museum of Modern Art, 1998
 Franz West, 1997
 Bruce Nauman, Museum of Modern Art, 1995
 Between a Rock and a Hard Place, Andy Warhol Foundation for the Visual Arts, 1994
 Mapping, Museum of Modern Art, 1994
 Robert Ryman, Museum of Modern Art, 1993
 Devil on the Stairs: Looking Back on the Eighties, 1991
 Dislocations, Museum of Modern Art, 1991
 Art, censorship and the First Amendment: this is not a test, 1991
 Philip Guston, 1986
 Tilted Arc: Enemy of the People?, 1985

References

External links
art gallery PKULTRA (formerly Form/Space Atelier)  Exhibits Robert Storr's Autograph And Other Work   
Watch Chuck Close and Robert Storr in Conversation on BUniverse 
Venice Bienniale website, English version.
"The Most Influential Americans in Art", in New York magazine, accessed 5 October 2006.
"Critic, artist and curator Robert Storr named Dean of the Yale School of Art". Yale University press release, February 28, 2006.
 Watch Robert Storr presenting his book Interviste sull'arte at Accademia di San Luca, Rome, May 17, 2019 (in English and Italian): https://www.youtube.com/watch?v=k037nOnh9KI

 Watch Robert Storr moderating the panel "Visions of Nature in the Age of Climate Change", Chiesa delle Penitenti, Venice, May 11–12, 2019 (as part of the public program of a Collateral Event of the 2019 Venice Biennale): https://www.youtube.com/watch?v=m9SdrhNDoT8&mc_cid=1209079652&mc_eid=ccae586ff2
 Watch Robert Storr speaking on The Cage Paintings of Gerhard Richter: https://www.youtube.com/watch?v=aOeKj-w-3fY
 Robert Storr interviewed by Judith Benhamou on his second volume of collected writings, 2022: https://judithbenhamouhuet.com/robert-storr-the-art-world-today-is-almost-entirely-commercial-a-meeting-with-the-great-american-art-critic-capable-of-numerous-premonitions/
 Artribune review of the book "Writings on Art 2006-2021" by Adriana Scalise: https://www.artribune.com/editoria/2022/06/libro-robert-storr-writings-on-art-2006-2021/

American art curators
American art critics
American artists
Swarthmore College alumni
School of the Art Institute of Chicago alumni
University of Chicago Laboratory Schools alumni
Living people
1949 births
Venice Biennale artistic directors